Noel "Sammy" Llewellyn is a former Trinidad and Tobago international football player.

He played most of his career in Trinidad and Tobago whilst working in the dock area of Port of Spain. In 1976, he was banned by the Trinidad and Tobago Football Federation for asking for financial compensation due to not being able to attend his work at the dock, and later being injured in the build up to a game. Llewellyn was on the Trinidad and Tobago team at the 1975 Pan American Games.

References 

Living people
Sportspeople from Port of Spain
Trinidad and Tobago footballers
Trinidad and Tobago expatriate footballers
Trinidad and Tobago international footballers
Los Angeles Aztecs players
North American Soccer League (1968–1984) players
Expatriate soccer players in the United States
Trinidad and Tobago expatriate sportspeople in the United States
Footballers at the 1975 Pan American Games
Pan American Games competitors for Trinidad and Tobago
1951 births
Association footballers not categorized by position